List of New York Cosmos may refer to:

List of New York Cosmos (1970–85) all-stars
List of New York Cosmos (1970–85) players
List of New York Cosmos (1970–85) seasons